Swenholt is a surname. Notable people with the surname include:

 Helmer Swenholt (1886–1952), American engineer
 Jonas Swenholt (1855–1923), American businessman and politician